The Ffestiniog Railway owns and operates a number of heritage and modern-day steam and diesel locomotives. A full list of these locomotives with details of their operational status is provided below.

Locomotives
The list includes past locomotives and present locomotives that are owned by, or  permanently housed at, the Ffestiniog Railway:

Steam locomotives

Diesel locomotives

Other rolling stock
For more detailed information on current and past rolling stock, visit the Railways own Heritage Group Wikipedia

These are the existing vehicles that are owned by or are permanently housed on the Ffestiniog Railway:-

Four-wheel passenger coaches and vans
The principal source of information for this table is the: "Rheilffordd Ffestiniog Railway Traveller's Guide" by the FR Company circa 2002, supplemented by later information as it becomes available.

Bogie passenger coaches and vans
The principal source of information for this table is the: "Rheilffordd Ffestiniog Railway Traveller's Guide" by the FR Company circa 2002, supplemented by later information as it becomes available. Updated with information from the General Appendix to the 2006 Rule Book.

See also

Notes

References

Ffestiniog Railway
United Kingdom narrow gauge rolling stock
Narrow gauge locomotives
Preserved narrow gauge steam locomotives of Great Britain